BD+00 316, also known as WASP-71 since 2019, is an F-class main sequence star about 1200 light-years away. The star is younger than the Sun at approximately 3.6 billion years, yet is already close to leaving the main sequence. BD+00 316 is enriched in heavy elements, having 140% of the solar abundance of iron.

Imaging surveys in 2015 and 2020 failed to find any stellar companions for BD+00 316.

The star was named Mpingo by Tanzanian amateur astronomers in 2020 as part of the NameExoWorlds contest.

Planetary system
In 2012 a transiting superjovian planet b was detected on a tight, circular orbit. The planetary orbit is well aligned with the equatorial plane of the star, the misalignment angle being equal to −1.9°. Its equilibrium temperature is 2016.1 K.

The planet was named Tanzanite by Tanzanian amateur astronomers in 2020 as part of the NameExoWorlds contest.

References

Cetus (constellation)
F-type main-sequence stars
Planetary systems with one confirmed planet
Planetary transit variables
J01570320+0045318
Durchmusterung objects